The 1981 Western Carolina Catamounts team was an American football team that represented Western Carolina University as a member of the Southern Conference (SoCon) during the 1981 NCAA Division I-A football season. In their 13th year under head coach Bob Waters, the team compiled an overall record of 4–7, with a mark of 3–4 in conference play, finishing in sixth place in the SoCon.

Schedule

References

Western Carolina
Western Carolina Catamounts football seasons
Western Carolina Catamounts football